The Old Curiosity Shop is a British television film adapted from the Charles Dickens's 1841 novel The Old Curiosity Shop.  It stars Irish actress Sophie Vavasseur as Nell Trent, with Derek Jacobi as her grandfather, Toby Jones as Quilp and George MacKay as Nell's friend, Kit. It was broadcast on 26 December 2007 on ITV. The adaptation is in general very faithful to the novel. The most significant changes are the removal of the Garlands and their household and the identity of the Single Gentleman (here called Jacob) who is changed from Grandfather's brother to his estranged son and Nell's father.

Cast
 Adrian Rawlins ...  Jacob
 Derek Jacobi ...  Grandfather
 Zoë Wanamaker ...  Mrs Jarley
 Toby Jones ...  Quilp
 Adam Godley ...  Sampson Brass
 Gina McKee ...  Sally Brass
 Bryan Dick ...  Freddie Trent
 Sophie Vavasseur ...  Nell Trent
 George MacKay ...  Kit Nubbles
 Steve Pemberton ...  Mr Short
 Martin Freeman ... Mr Codlin
 Josie Lawrence ...  Mrs Jiniwin
 Bradley Walsh ...  Mr Liggers
 Anna Madeley ...  Betsey Quilp
 Geoff Breton ...  Dick Swiveller
 Charlene McKenna ...  The Marchioness
Kelly Campbell ...  Mrs Nubbles
Katie Dunne ...  Baby Nubbles
Philip Noone ... Rodney (Rogue Trader)

Critical reception
The Hollywood Reporter noted "a sorrowful story of greed, poverty and grief, and ITV's version makes the most of it...Writer Martyn Hesford keeps the story tidy, while director Brian Percival moves things along while helping his cast to resist the temptation to be overly Dickensian...Jacobi finds some vinegar in what could easily be a sweet old man, and Jones gives some shading to Quilp's villainy. Stephen McKeon's versatile score helps considerably." The Guardian wrote "Toby Jones, as the revolting Daniel Quilp, steals just about anything he can get his hands on, including the show."

References

External links

The Old Curiosity Shop at pbs.org

2007 television films
2007 films
British television films
Films directed by Brian Percival
Films based on The Old Curiosity Shop
ITV television dramas
Television series set in the 19th century
Television shows based on works by Charles Dickens